<onlyinclude>

April 2021

See also

References

killings by law enforcement officers
 04